The Feetham Function Committee was one of three British committees which sat in Indian from 1918 to 1919, including also the Southborough Franchise Committee and the Committee on Home Administration. The Feetham committee was headed by Richard Feetham, and recommended "the allocation of subjects between the centre and the provinces", as well as "the division of provincial subjects into the Reserved and Transferred categories."

References

British Indian history
1918 in India
1919 in India